The Afon Morlais is a small river in south Wales, a tributary of the River Loughor.

It rises in the village of Cross Hands and then flows southwards through Tumble before turning south east through a rural wooded valley before passing through Llangennech and making its confluence with the River Loughor in its tidal reach.

A minor road from Cil Ddewi to Blaenhiraeth crosses the river via a Grade II listed bridge.

References

External links 
 History of Troserch Wood

Rivers of Carmarthenshire